Unnaruge Naan Irundhal is a 1999 Indian Tamil-language romantic comedy film directed by Selva. The film stars R. Parthiban and Meena played the lead roles. Manorama, Vadivelu, Vivek, and Anandaraj play supporting roles. Rambha played a guest appearance in this movie. The film has music by Deva, editing by Suresh Urs, and cinematography by R. Raghunatha Reddy. It released on 3 December 1999 and became a commercial hit.

Plot
R. Parthiban plays a die-hard fan of Rambha and a self-interest governed taxi driver whose name is never revealed throughout the movie. Meena plays Mahalakshmi, the daughter of a "zamindar" who has lost all his money due to financial troubles; his death leaves Mahalakshmi with a lot of debts (over two lakhs worth). Parthiban is the taxi driver that drives Mahalakshmi's dead father's corpse back to her hometown. There, the people that Mahalakshmi is now indebted to by Anandaraj, who tortures Mahalakshmi with cruel words for being unable to pay the debt. Later, Parthiban helps Mahalakshmi out by giving his taxi in replace to her debt in order to save her at the point of time. However, the twist in the movie is that Parthiban irritates Mahalakshmi, though unwillingly, to get back his taxi as soon as possible. In the later part, Mahalakshmi falls in love with Parthiban for his continuous help and support towards Mahalakshmi. At that time Parthiban's dream girl actress, Rambha, comes for shooting in that palace, which makes Mahalakshmi very angry and jealous as all his attention has been diverted to Rambha. At the end of the shooting, Rambha tries to talk to Parthiban and Mahalakshmi and make them realize their love for each other. However, Mahalakshmi never sees any sign of Parthiban loving her and thus accepts to marry the villain (Anandaraj's) son to get back Parthiban's taxi and settle her debt. Eventually, Parthiban realizes his love for Mahalakshmi and tries to stop the wedding as the groom is also a bad guy who cheated Manorama's daughter. Finally the movie ends on a happy note with Mahalakshmi getting back all her money and property and leading a happy life with Parthiban.

Cast

 R. Parthiban as Taxi Driver
 Meena as Mahalakshmi
 Manorama as Caring Maid
 Vadivelu as Vadivelu
 Vivek as Film Director
 Anandaraj as Jamindar
 Jai Ganesh as Rajamgam
 Sathyapriya as Sathyavadi
 Fathima Babu as Jamindar's wife
 Santhana Bharathi
 Kaka Radhakrishnan
 Vaiyapuri 
Nellai Siva
 Rambha (guest appearance)
 Indraja (item dance)
 Anand (guest appearance)
 Anju Aravind (guest appearance)
 Sindhu (Vadivelu's Lover)

Soundtrack
Soundtrack was composed by Deva and lyrics were written by Palani Bharathi, Na. Muthukumar, Kalai Kumar, Subash, Thamarai. The soundtrack was released under the label "Saregama".

Critical reception
Indolink wrote, "Unnaruge Naan Irundhal" is a painful rememberance (sic) that Nakkal & Nyaandi are here to stay in all of Parthi's forthcoming films.  With the rather mediocre combination of Parthi & Director Selva, this quickie production's real highlights only involve Vadivelu & Vivek, which only reflects the sad state of films today." Kalki praised Selva for making a film without the usual twists, fights, emotional scenes and also praised Parthiban for acting.

References

External links

2000 films
2000 romantic drama films
2000s Tamil-language films
Films directed by Selva (director)
Films scored by Deva (composer)
Indian romantic drama films